The Use of Sarum (or Use of Salisbury, also known as the Sarum Rite) is the liturgical use of the Latin rites developed at Salisbury Cathedral and used from the late eleventh century until the English Reformation. It is largely identical to the Roman Rite, with about ten per cent of its material drawn from other sources. The cathedral's liturgy was widely respected during the late Middle Ages, and churches throughout the British Isles and parts of northwestern Europe adapted its customs for celebrations of the Eucharist and canonical hours. The use has a unique ecumenical position in influencing and being authorized by Roman Catholic, Eastern Orthodox, and Anglican churches.

Origins

In 1078, William of Normandy appointed Osmund, a Norman nobleman, as bishop of Salisbury (the period name of the site whose ruins are now known as Old Sarum). As bishop, Osmund initiated some revisions to the extant Celtic-Anglo-Saxon rite and the local adaptations of the Roman rite, drawing on both Norman and Anglo-Saxon traditions.

Nineteenth-century liturgists theorized that the liturgical practices of Rouen in northern France inspired the Sarum liturgical books. The Normans had deposed most of the Anglo-Saxon episcopate, replacing them with Norman bishops, of which Osmund was one. Given the similarities between the liturgy in Rouen and that of Sarum, it appears the Normans imported their French liturgical books as well.

Dissemination
The revisions during Osmund's episcopate resulted in the compilation of a new missal, breviary, and other liturgical manuals, which came to be used throughout southern England, Wales, and parts of Ireland.

Some dioceses issued their own missals, inspired by the Sarum Use, but with their own particular prayers and ceremonies. Some of these are so different that they have been identified as effectively distinct liturgies, such as those of Hereford, York, Bangor, and Aberdeen. Other missals (such as those of Lincoln Cathedral or Westminster Abbey) were more evidently based on the Sarum Use and varied only in details.

Liturgical historians believe the Sarum Use had a distinct influence upon other usages of the Roman rite outside England, such as the Nidaros rite in Norway and the Braga Rite in Portugal.

Reception
Even after the Church of England was established separate from the Catholic Church, the Canterbury Convocation declared in 1543 that the Sarum Breviary would be used for the canonical hours. Under Edward VI of England, the use provided the foundational material for the Book of Common Prayer and remains influential in English liturgies. Mary I restored the Use of Sarum in 1553, but it fell out of use under Elizabeth I.

Sarum Use remains a permitted use for Roman Catholics, as Pope Pius V permitted the continuation of uses more than two hundred years old under the Apostolic Constitution Quo primum. In practice, a brief resurgence of interest in the 19th century did not lead to a revival.

Some Western Rite Orthodox congregations have adopted the use due to its antiquity and similarities with the Byzantine Rite. This includes Western Rite members of the Russian Orthodox Church Outside Russia, as well as the Old Calendarist Autonomous Orthodox Metropolia of North and South America and the British Isles.

In spite of interest in the Sarum Use, its publication in Latin sources from the sixteenth century and earlier has inhibited its modern adoption. Several academic projects are gradually improving its accessibility. From 2009 to 2013, Bangor University produced a series of films and other resources as part of The Experience of Worship research project. In 2006, McMaster University launched an ongoing project to create an edition and English translation of the complete Sarum Use with its original plainsong, resulting in the publication of over 10,000 musical works, and expected to be completed in 2022.

Sarum ritual

The ceremonies of the Sarum Rite are nearly identical to the Tridentine Mass. The Mass of Sundays and great feasts involved up to four sacred ministers: priest, deacon, subdeacon, and acolyte. It was customary for them to visit in procession all the altars of the church and cense them, ending at the great rood screen (or whatever barrier between the laity and the altar), where antiphons and collects would be sung. At the screen would be read the Bidding Prayers, prayers in the vernacular directing the people to pray for various intentions. The procession then vested for Mass.

Some of the prayers of the Mass are unique, such as the priest's preparation prayers for Holy Communion. Some ceremonies differ from the Tridentine Mass, though they are not unknown in other forms of the western rites: the offering of the bread and wine was (as in the Dominican and other rites) made by one act. These distinctions have been evaluated as "of the most trifling character." The chalice was prepared between the readings of the Epistle and the Gospel. In addition, in common with many monastic rites, after the Elevation the celebrant stood with his arms outstretched in the form of a cross; the Particle was put into the chalice after the Agnus Dei. It is probable that communion under one kind was followed by a 'rinse' of unconsecrated wine. The first chapter of St John's Gospel was read while the priest made his way back to the sacristy. Two candles on the altar were customary, though others were placed around it and on the rood screen. The Sarum missal calls for a low bow as an act of reverence, rather than the genuflection.

Influence on Anglo-Catholics
The ritual of Sarum Use has influenced even churches that do not use its text, obscuring understanding of the original:

Many of the ornaments and ceremonial practices associated with the Sarum rite—though not the full liturgy itself—were revived in the Anglican Communion in the late 19th and early 20th centuries, as part of the Anglo-Catholic Oxford Movement in the Church of England. Some Anglo-Catholics wanted to find a traditional formal liturgy that was characteristically "English" rather than "Roman." They took advantage of the 'Ornaments Rubric' of 1559, which directed that English churches were to use "...such Ornaments of the Church, and of the Ministers thereof, at all Times of their Ministration, shall be retained, and be in use, as were in this Church of England, by the Authority of Parliament, in the Second Year of the Reign of Edward VI of England, i.e. January 1548 - January 1549, before the First Prayer Book came into effect in June of the latter year (which authorized the use of traditional vestments and was quite explicit that the priest shall wear an alb, vestment (chasuble) or cope and that the deacons shall be vested in albs and tunicles (dalmatics). However, there was a tendency to read back Victorian centralizing tendencies into mediaeval texts, and so a rather rubrical spirit was applied to liturgical discoveries.

It was asserted, for instance, that Sarum had a well-developed series of colours of vestments for different feasts. There may have been tendencies to use a particular colour for a particular feast (red, for instance, was used on Sundays, as in the Ambrosian rite), but most churches were simply too poor to have several sets of vestments, and so used what they had. There was considerable variation from diocese to diocese, or even church to church, in the details of the rubrics: the place where the Epistle was sung, for instance, varied enormously; from a lectern at the altar, from a lectern in the quire, to the feature described as the 'pulpitum', a word used ambiguously for the place of reading (a pulpit) or for the rood screen. Some scholars thought that the readings were proclaimed from the top of the rood screen, which was most unlikely given the tiny access doors to the rood loft in most churches. This would not have permitted dignified access for a vested Gospel procession.

Chief among the proponents of Sarum customs was the Anglican priest Percy Dearmer, who put these into practice (according to his own interpretation) at his parish of St Mary the Virgin, Primrose Hill, in London. He explained them at length in The Parson's Handbook, which ran through several editions. This style of worship has been retained in some present-day Anglican churches and monastic institutions, where it is known as "English Use" (Dearmer's term) or "Prayer Book Catholicism".

In popular culture
Edith Wharton refers to the "Sarum Rule" in Book I of her 1905 novel The House of Mirth.

References

External links
The Use of Sarum, commonly known as the Sarum Rite: ongoing edition and English translation of the complete Sarum Use
The Experience of Worship: films and resources for the general public on worship in late medieval England produced in 2009–13
 The book of Psalms sung in Sarum Use plainsong by Sarah James.

Roman Rite
Anglican sacraments
Anglo-Catholicism
Book of Common Prayer
Diocese of Salisbury